Leon Rotman (born 22 July 1934) is a retired Romanian sprint canoeist. He won two individual gold medals at the 1956 Olympics and a bronze medal in 1960.

Life and sporting career
Rotman is Jewish, and was born to a working-class Jewish family. He took up several sports in the years immediately after World War II and was fascinated by canoeing after seeing the famous Czech champions Jan Brzák-Felix and Bohumil Kudrna compete on Lake Snagov near Bucharest in 1953. He joined the Dinamo Bucharest sports club, in the hope of getting one of the Czech-made canoes left by the two in Romania. He did not, but he was remarked by famous coach Radu Huţan after becoming national champion in improvised canoes.

He would eventually compete at the Olympics on the first canoe ever made in Romania (at the factories in Reghin, Mureș County). At the 1956 Summer Olympic Games in Melbourne, despite having a sprained ankle, Rotman won both the C-1 1000 m and 10000 m events, equaling Swede Gert Fredriksson's performance who, at the same Olympics, won gold in both individual kayak events. He was the first Romanian to win two medals in one Olympics. At the next Olympics he won a bronze in the C-1 1000 m event. He was slightly less successful in other competitions (fifth in the 1957 and 1961 European Championships in C-1 1000 m, and seventh at the 1963 World Championships in C-1 10000 m). He won, however, the Snagov Regatta seven times and 14 national titles before retiring in 1963.

After retiring from competitions Rotman worked as a canoeing coach in Bucharest.

See also
List of select Jewish canoeists

References

External links

1956 Canoe/Kayak Flatwater medalists on the IOC website
Romanian Canoe and Kayak olympic medalists' biographies on the Romanian Olympic Foundation website 
History of Canoe/Kayak in Romania on the FRKC website 

1934 births
Living people
Sportspeople from Bucharest
Jewish Romanian sportspeople
Romanian male canoeists
Canoeists at the 1956 Summer Olympics
Canoeists at the 1960 Summer Olympics
Olympic canoeists of Romania
Olympic gold medalists for Romania
Olympic bronze medalists for Romania
Olympic medalists in canoeing
Medalists at the 1960 Summer Olympics
Medalists at the 1956 Summer Olympics